Slottsparken (Swedish or Norwegian for the Palace Park or the Castle Park) may refer to

Palace Park, a public park surrounding the Royal Palace, Oslo, Norway
Slottsparken, Malmö or Kungsparken, Malmö
Slottsparken, Örebro, a park located on a small island east of Örebro Castle
Slottsparken, Växjö, a park surrounding Teleborg Castle, Växjö